Bronwyn McGahan is an Irish Sinn Féin politician who was selected by her party as a member (MLA) of the Northern Ireland Assembly to represent the Fermanagh and South Tyrone constituency in June 2012.

She replaced her party colleague Michelle Gildernew, who had resigned from the Northern Ireland Assembly as part of Sinn Féin's policy of abolishing double jobbing after being elected to the parliament of the United Kingdom. Gildernew was defeated for re-election as abstentionist MP in 2015 by 530 votes to Ulster Unionist Party candidate Tom Elliott.

References

1972 births
Living people
Sinn Féin MLAs
Northern Ireland MLAs 2011–2016
Female members of the Northern Ireland Assembly